Siri Hangeland (born 1 April 1952) is a Norwegian feminist, civic leader and politician.

She served two terms as president of the Norwegian Association for Women's Rights, from 1990 to 1992 and from 1998 to 2004. From 1996 to 1997 she served as a member of the Committee for Human Rights, a governmental committee appointed by the Ministry of Foreign Affairs.  She was also a board member of the International Alliance of Women. She is a member of the Socialist Left Party and is a member of that party's committee on women's issues. She graduated with the cand.philol. degree in Norwegian language at the University of Bergen in 1981, with a dissertation titled Sosiolingvistiske forhold i Kristiansand bymål.

References

Norwegian women's rights activists
1952 births
Living people
Norwegian feminists
University of Bergen alumni
Socialist Left Party (Norway) politicians
Norwegian socialist feminists
20th-century Norwegian politicians
21st-century Norwegian politicians
20th-century Norwegian women politicians
21st-century Norwegian women politicians
Norwegian Association for Women's Rights people